Air Commodore Sir Peter Beckford Rutgers Vanneck  (7 January 1922 – 2 August 1999) was a British Royal Navy officer, fighter pilot, engineer, stockbroker and politician. He made notable contributions to Anglo-French relations as Lord Mayor of London and as a Member of the European Parliament.

Early life
Vanneck was born on 7 January 1922 in London, the youngest son of Lord Huntingfield and American-born Margaret Eleanor Crosby.

He spent his early years in Australia during his father's tenure as Governor of Victoria in the 1930s. He attended Geelong Grammar School and was sent back to Britain to study at Stowe School, having won a scholarship.

War service and Royal Navy career
Vanneck joined the Royal Navy during World War II. He studied at the Royal Naval College as an officer cadet from 1 January 1940 to 1 September 1940, when he passed out as a midshipman. He served on  during the operation to sink the Bismarck, and on HMS Eskimo. He commanded a LCA during service off North African coast.

Having attended a promotion course in Portsmouth from May to August 1941, he was promoted to sub lieutenant on 10 October 1942 with seniority from 1 August 1941. He joined the crew of the sloop  in December 1942. He was promoted to lieutenant on 25 May 1943 with seniority from 1 December 1942. HMS Wren was part of the 2nd Escort Group under the command of Captain Johnnie Walker, the most successful anti-submarine unit of World War II. He commanded a Motor Torpedo Boat from August 1944 to the end of the war.

After the war, he trained as a pilot. On 30 September 1945, he transferred to 771 Naval Air Squadron of the Fleet Air Arm. The squadron was based at RNAS Yeovilton. He transferred to 807 Naval Air Squadron on 18 August 1947. He retired from the Royal Navy on 24 May 1949, when he resigned his commission.

University and Air Force service
After leaving the Royal Navy in 1949, Vanneck matriculated at Trinity College, Cambridge. He joined the Cambridge University Air Squadron to further pursue his interest in flying, and was commissioned into the Royal Air Force Volunteer Reserve as a flying officer on 17 November 1949.

He transferred to No. 601 (County of London) Squadron of the Royal Auxiliary Air Force in 1950 and was commissioned into the RAuxAF as a flying officer on 18 December 1950 with seniority from 9 October 1950. He was promoted to flight lieutenant on 16 July 1951 with seniority from 9 October 1950. He graduated from the University of Cambridge with a Master of Arts in engineering. He studied at Harvard University, US in 1953. While there, he was seconded to 101 Squadron Massachusetts Air National Guard, flying the P-51 Mustang.

In 1958, he transferred to No. 3619 (County of Suffolk) Fighter Control Unit based at RAF Nacton He was promoted to squadron leader on 1 July 1958. He commanded the unit from 28 June 1959 to 1 February 1961. He then moved No 1 (County of Hertford) Maritime Headquarters Unit based at RAF Northwood. On 1 July 1962, he was promoted to group captain and appointed Inspector of the Royal Auxiliary Air Force. He resigned that appointment and retired from the Royal Auxiliary Air Force on 1 September 1973.

Business career
Vanneck then went into business with the engineering company Ransome's in Ipswich, followed by Rowe and Pitman (stockbrokers) in the City of London. He was appointed to the Council of the London Stock Exchange in 1968. He was Deputy Chairman from 1973 to 1975. He retired from the Council in 1979.

Political career
Vanneck became involved in Municipal affairs through the City of London Corporation (as Alderman for Cordwainer Ward and a member of many Livery Companies).

After a year serving as a Sheriff of London in 1974, he was elected the 650th Lord Mayor of London in November 1977, towards the end of the Queen's Silver Jubilee year. He held an eloquent speech at the Guildhall in which he recalled the first time he had met The Queen, who accompanied her father during a visit to the Royal Naval College when Vanneck was a young cadet there.

A popular Lord Mayor, Vanneck declared that despite his interesting careers, he had missed out on the one he would most like, which was to be a tug-boat skipper on the Thames. He made excellent contacts with his Paris counterpart Jacques Chirac and arranged an official visit to visit (one of only two that had taken place since the French revolution). Vanneck was a Francophile who was fluent in French.

At the end of his Lord Mayoral term, Vanneck was adopted as Conservative candidate for the European Parliament for Cleveland. He won the seat at the 1979 election, enjoying his time in the European institutions. He was vice-chairman of the Political Affairs committee and served on Energy Resources and Technology. After keeping his seat by only 2,625 votes in 1984, he lost in the 1989 election, and then retired from public life.

Later life
High Sheriff of Suffolk from 1974 until his death, Vanneck continued to enjoy yacht racing (a member of the Royal Yacht Squadron, he was a regular at Cowes Week). Vanneck was a freemason.

He died on 2 August 1999 in London.

Honours and decorations
As part of the 1955 Queen's Birthday Honours, Vanneck was awarded the Air Force Cross (AFC). In the 1963 New Year Honours, he was appointed Officer of the Order of the British Empire (OBE). In January 1965, he was appointed a Knight of the Venerable Order of Saint John. As part of the 1973 Queen's Birthday Honours, he was appointed Companion of the Order of the Bath (CB). He was promoted to Knight Grand Cross of the Order of the British Empire (GBE) as Lord Mayor of London elect.

He was appointed aide-de-camp to Queen Elizabeth II on 26 February 1963. He relinquish the appointment on 1 September 1973, when he retired from the Royal Auxiliary Air Force. He was a Deputy Lieutenant of the County of London from 1970. He was appointed to the honorary position of Inspector-General of the Royal Auxiliary Air Force on 16 September 1974, and held it until 1 January 1984.

References

Obituary, The Times, 26 August 1999
"Who Was Who", A&C Black

External links
European Parliament site

1922 births
1999 deaths
People from Eye, Suffolk
Alumni of Trinity College, Cambridge
Harvard University people
Sheriffs of the City of London
20th-century lord mayors of London
Royal Navy officers of World War II
Fleet Air Arm aviators
People educated at Geelong Grammar School
People educated at Stowe School
Conservative Party (UK) MEPs
Councilmen and Aldermen of the City of London
Gentlemen Ushers
Younger sons of barons
MEPs for England 1979–1984
High Sheriffs of Suffolk

Knights Grand Cross of the Order of the British Empire
Recipients of the Air Force Cross (United Kingdom)
Companions of the Order of the Bath
Knights of the Order of St John

Commandeurs of the Légion d'honneur
Grand Officers of the Order of the Crown (Belgium)
English stockbrokers
English people of American descent
English people of Dutch descent
English people of French descent
English people of French-Canadian descent
British people of Scandinavian descent
Freemasons of the United Grand Lodge of England
Fleet Air Arm personnel of World War II
20th-century English businesspeople
Royal Air Force officers
Deputy Lieutenants of Greater London
Peter